Cream is a dairy product composed of the higher-fat layer skimmed from the top of milk before homogenization. In un-homogenized milk, the fat, which is less dense, eventually rises to the top. In the industrial production of cream, this process is accelerated by using centrifuges called "separators". In many countries, it is sold in several grades depending on the total butterfat content. It can be dried to a powder for shipment to distant markets, and contains high levels of saturated fat.

Cream skimmed from milk may be called "sweet cream" to distinguish it from cream skimmed from whey, a by-product of cheese-making. Whey cream has a lower fat content and tastes more salty, tangy and "cheesy". In many countries partially fermented cream is also sold: sour cream, crème fraîche, and so on.  Both forms have many culinary uses in both sweet and savoury dishes.

Cream produced by cattle (particularly Jersey cattle) grazing on natural pasture often contains some carotenoid pigments derived from the plants they eat; traces of these intensely colored pigments give milk a slightly yellow tone, hence the name of the yellowish-white color: cream. Carotenoids are also the origin of butter's yellow color. Cream from goat's milk, water buffalo milk, or from cows fed indoors on grain or grain-based pellets, is white.

Cuisine

Cream is used as an ingredient in many foods, including ice cream, many sauces, soups, stews, puddings, and some custard bases, and is also used for cakes. Whipped cream is served as a topping on ice cream sundaes, milkshakes, lassi, eggnog, sweet pies, strawberries, blueberries or peaches. Cream is also used in Indian curries such as masala dishes.

Cream (usually light/single cream or half and half) may be added to coffee.

Both single and double cream (see Types for definitions) can be used in cooking. Double cream or full-fat crème fraîche is often used when the cream is added to a hot sauce, to prevent it separating or "splitting". Double cream can be thinned with milk to make an approximation of single cream.

The French word crème denotes not only dairy cream but also other thick liquids such as sweet and savory custards, which are normally made with milk, not cream.

Types 

Different grades of cream are distinguished by their fat content, whether they have been heat-treated, whipped, and so on. In many jurisdictions, there are regulations for each type.

Australia and New Zealand
The Australia New Zealand Food Standards Code – Standard 2.5.2 – Defines cream as a milk product comparatively rich in fat, in the form of an emulsion of fat-in-skim milk, which can be obtained by separation from milk. Cream sold without further specification must contain no less than 350 g/kg (35%) milk fat.

Manufacturers labels may distinguish between different fat contents, a general guideline is as follows:

Canada 

Canadian cream definitions are similar to those used in the United States, except for "light cream", which is very low-fat cream, usually with 5 or 6 percent butterfat. Specific product characteristics are generally uniform throughout Canada, but names vary by both geographic and linguistic area and by manufacturer: "coffee cream" may be 10 or 18 percent cream and "half-and-half" ("crème légère") may be 3, 5, 6 or 10 percent, all depending on location and brand.

Regulations allow cream to contain acidity regulators and stabilizers. For whipping cream, allowed additives include skim milk powder (≤ 0.25%), glucose solids (≤ 0.1%), calcium sulphate (≤ 0.005%), and xanthan gum (≤ 0.02%). The content of milk fat in canned cream must be displayed as a percentage followed by "milk fat", "B.F", or "M.F".

France 
In France, the use of the term "cream" for food products is defined by the decree 80-313 of April 23, 1980. It specifies the minimum rate of milk fat (12%) as well as the rules for pasteurisation or UHT sterilisation. The mention "crème fraîche" (fresh cream) can only be used for pasteurised creams conditioned on production site within 24h after pasteurisation. Even if food additives complying with French and European laws are allowed, usually, none will be found in plain "crèmes" and "crèmes fraîches" apart from lactic ferments (some low cost creams (or close to creams) can contain thickening agents, but rarely). Fat content is commonly shown as "XX% M.G." ("matière grasse").

Russia 
Russia, as well as other EAC countries, legally separates cream into two classes: normal (10–34% butterfat) and heavy (35–58%), but the industry has pretty much standardized around the following types:

Sweden
In Sweden, cream is usually sold as:
Matlagningsgrädde ("cooking cream"), 10–15 %
Kaffegrädde ("Coffee cream"), 10-12 %, earlier mostly 12 %
Vispgrädde (whipping cream), 36–40 %, the 36 % variant often has additives.

Mellangrädde (27%) is, nowadays, a less common variant. 
Gräddfil (usually 12 %) and Creme Fraiche (usually around 35 %) are two common sour cream products.

Switzerland 

In Switzerland, the types of cream are legally defined as follows:

Sour cream and crème fraîche (German: Sauerrahm, Crème fraîche; French: crème acidulée, crème fraîche; Italian: panna acidula, crème fraîche) are defined as cream soured by bacterial cultures.

Thick cream (German: verdickter Rahm; French: crème épaissie; Italian: panna addensata) is defined as cream thickened using thickening agents.

United Kingdom

In the United Kingdom, these types of cream are produced. Fat content must meet the Food Labelling Regulations 1996.

United States
In the United States, cream is usually sold as:

Not all grades are defined by all jurisdictions, and the exact fat content ranges vary. The above figures, except for "manufacturer's cream", are based on the Code of Federal Regulations, Title 21, Part 131.

Processing and additives
Cream may have thickening agents and stabilizers added. Thickeners include sodium alginate, carrageenan, gelatine, sodium bicarbonate, tetrasodium pyrophosphate, and alginic acid.

Other processing may be carried out. For example, cream has a tendency to produce oily globules (called "feathering") when added to coffee. The stability of the cream may be increased by increasing the non-fat solids content, which can be done by partial demineralisation and addition of sodium caseinate, although this is expensive.

Other cream products

 by churning cream to separate the butterfat and buttermilk. This can be done by hand or by machine.

Whipped cream is made by whisking or mixing air into cream with more than 30% fat, to turn the liquid cream into a soft solid. Nitrous oxide, from whipped-cream chargers may also be used to make whipped cream.

Sour cream, produced in many countries, is cream (12 to 16% or more milk fat) that has been subjected to a bacterial culture that produces lactic acid (0.5%+), which sours and thickens it.

Crème fraîche (28% milk fat) is slightly soured with bacterial culture, but not as sour or as thick as sour cream. Mexican crema (or cream espesa) is similar to crème fraîche.

Smetana is a heavy cream-derived (15–40% milk fat) Central and Eastern European sweet or sour cream.

Rjome or rømme is Norwegian sour cream containing 35% milk fat, similar to Icelandic sýrður rjómi.

Clotted cream in the United Kingdom is made through a process that starts by slowly heating whole milk to produce a very high-fat (55%) product, similar to Indian malai.

Reduced cream is a cream product in New Zealand, often used to make Kiwi dip.

Other items called "cream"
Some non-edible substances are called creams due to their consistency: shoe cream is runny, unlike regular waxy shoe polish;  hand/body "creme" or "skin cream" is meant for moisturizing the skin.

Regulations in many jurisdictions restrict the use of the word cream for foods. Words such as creme, kreme, creame, or whipped topping (e.g., Cool Whip) are often used for products which cannot legally be called cream, though in some jurisdictions even these spellings may be disallowed, for example under the doctrine of idem sonans. Oreo and Hydrox cookies are a type of sandwich cookie in which two biscuits have a soft, sweet filling between them that is called "crème filling." In some cases, foods can be described as cream although they do not contain predominantly milk fats; for example, in Britain, "ice cream" can contain non-milk fat (declared on the label) in addition to or instead of cream, and salad cream is the customary name for a non-dairy condiment that has been produced since the 1920s.

In other languages, cognates of "cream" are also sometimes used for non-food products, such as fogkrém (Hungarian for toothpaste), or Sonnencreme (German for sunscreen).

Some products are described as "cream alternatives". For example, Elmlea Double, etc. are blends of buttermilk or lentils and vegetable oil with other additives sold by Upfield in the United Kingdom packaged and shelved in the same way as cream, labelled as having "a creamy taste".

See also
Artificial cream
Buttercream
Condensed milk
 Crème, a French culinary term for cream-like preparations
Crème fraîche
Crème liqueur

Ice cream
Kaymak, which is similar to clotted cream
 List of cream soups
Sour cream

References

External links
Nutrition chart for heavy cream

Virtual Museum Exhibit on Milk, Cream & Butter

Dairy products
Condiments